Mohammad Reza Safdarian Korouyeh is an Iranian Rock climber and Ice climber. Safdarian has won the first Gold medal in Iran′s ice climbing history in the Ice Climbing World Tour at Rabenestin in Italy, and a Bronze medal in 2018 UIAA Ice Climbing World Tour. and a Bronze medal in 2019 UIAA Ice Climbing World Combined championships. and a Bronze medal in 2018 UIAA Ice Climbing World Cup Overall Ranking Lead. The International Climbing and Mountaineering Federation named him the "History Boy". He has participated in 27 World Cups, World Championships and Asian Championships since 2013.

Records and achievements

Medals
Gold Medal at UIAA Ice Climbing World Cup Lead (Italy 2018) (First time in Iran's ice climbing history)
Bronze Medal at UIAA Ice Climbing World Combined Championship (Russia 2019) (First time in Iran's ice climbing history)
Bronze Medal at UIAA Ice Climbing Overall Ranking Lead (2018) (First time in Iran's ice climbing history)
Bronze Medal at UIAA Ice Climbing World Cup Lead (Switzerland 2018)
Silver Medal at UIAA Ice Climbing Asian Championships, Lead (South Korea 2016)
Bronze Medal at UIAA Ice Climbing Asian Championships, Lead (South Korea 2018)
Team Gold Medal at UIAA Ice Climbing Asian Championships (South Korea 2018)
Team silver Medal at UIAA Ice Climbing World Championships (Russia 2018) 
Team silver Medal at UIAA Ice Climbing World Championships (Russia 2019) 
Team Bronze Medal at UIAA Ice Climbing World Championships (French 2017) 
Team Silver Medal at UIAA Ice Climbing Asian Championships (South Korea 2018)

Ranks
 Rank 4 in UIAA Ice Climbing World Cup, Lead (Russia 2018)
 Rank 6 in UIAA Ice Climbing World Cup, Lead (South Korea 2018)
 Rank 5 in UIAA Ice Climbing World Cup, Lead (China 2018)
 Rank 6 in UIAA Ice Climbing World Cup, Speed (China 2018)
 Rank 5 in UIAA Ice Climbing World Cup, Speed (French 2017)
 Rank 8 in UIAA Ice Climbing World Championships, Difficulty of route (Italy 2017)
 Rank 7 in UIAA Ice Climbing World Cup, Speed (Italy 2017)
 Rank 7 in UIAA Ice Climbing World Cup, Difficulty of route (South Korea 2016)
 Rank 8 in UIAA Ice Climbing World Cup, Difficulty of route (Italy 2016)
 Rank 8 in UIAA Ice Climbing World Cup, Difficulty of route (Switzerland 2016)

References 
The information in this article is based on that in its Persian equivalent.

Living people
Year of birth missing (living people)
Iranian rock climbers
Ice climbers